Bar Złoto dla Zuchwałych is the fourth local season of the reality The Bar in Poland.

Synopsis
Start Date: 28 February 2004.
End Date: 12 June 2004.
Duration: 106 days.
Translation: Złoto dla zuchwałych means Gold for sly and relates to the prize of 6 kg of pure gold.
Contestants:
The Finalists: Mirka (The Winner) & Arek* (Runner-up).
Evicted Contestants: Adrian, Agnieszka F, Agnieszka K, Aldek, Ania, Anna, Beata, Bernadetta, Damian, Dobroslawa, Eliza, Eric, Fatima, Iwona, Iza, Joanna, Karol*, Karolina, Klaudiusz, Magda M, Magda W, Maja, Marta, Mounir, Oleg, Piotr G, Piotr T, Ramona, Robert, Sebastian, Sylwia R, Sylwia W & Wiola.
Voluntary Exits: Dorota & Leszek.

* Karol was evicted twice. Arek was previously evicted.

Format: Bar 4 contained 2 teams of contestants, a team from the general public and a team of Reality All Stars who had appeared in previous editions of Bar or Big Brother.

Contestants

Nominations

References

2004 Polish television seasons